Pablo García Moreno (born 30 May 1985) is a Spanish footballer who plays for CP Villarrobledo as a right back.

Football career
Born in Albacete, Castilla-La Mancha, García graduated from Albacete Balompié's youth setup, and made his debuts as a senior with the reserves in the 2004–05 campaign, in Tercera División. He made his first team – and La Liga – debut on 6 March 2005, starting in a 1–3 away loss against Athletic Bilbao.

In the 2006 summer García moved to Segunda División B side Orihuela CF. He resumed his career in the third and fourth levels in the following years, representing CD Roquetas, CD Teruel, Bakú Hellín Deportivo, UD Almansa and La Roda CF.

References

External links

1985 births
Living people
Sportspeople from Albacete
Spanish footballers
Footballers from Castilla–La Mancha
Association football defenders
La Liga players
Segunda División players
Segunda División B players
Tercera División players
Atlético Albacete players
Albacete Balompié players
Orihuela CF players
CD Teruel footballers
UD Almansa players
La Roda CF players